The West End is an area of the city of Davenport, Iowa, and is bordered by both W. 9th street, W. 8th Street, N. Marquette Street, the Mississippi River, and I-280. Its main streets are Rockingham Road, Telegraph Road, N. Division Street, and N. Marquette St. The area is also known to be "West Davenport".

History
The West End and its history traces back with the War of 1812 in which both the Sauks were fighting the British on what would be known as Credit Island, making the area to be first known. Then, on September 4–5, 1814, another Credit Island occurred with Major Zachary Taylor being the commander of the U.S. with the Indians' commander being Black Hawk, and in the end only one was killed, making the location to be a historic site for visitors.

In 1832, Chief Keokuk signed a treaty to end the Black Hawk War, along with General Winfield Scott, while Antoine LeClaire, a Native himself with French descent, served as Translator. When Davenport was established in 1836 by Antoine LeClaire and named after his good friend Colonel George Davenport, the West End was also established.

In 1836, the areas bordered, today, by W. 9th street, W. 8th Street, N. Marquette Street, the Mississippi River, and I-280, were laid out as the Rockingham Township, simply known as Rockingham. For over a century, Rockingham was a rival city to its eastern neighbor, Davenport.

In 1890, the state's very first crematory happened in the nearby cemetery to Tri-City, designed by Architect Fritz Clausen, who made it in a style called "Richardsonian Romanesque". Clausen is Davenport's single most important Architect in its history. The first cremation at the place was truly a dead large sheep.

Through-out the late 1800s and early 1900s, murders and suicides occurred. One such case, in which a woman by the name of Maggie Durley, was murdered by her husband, an African-American named William. Durley dumped his wife's body onto the area's rural parts, and confessed it was punishment for her. Another case involved with a couple who both committed suicide by jumping into the Mississippi river over at Credit island.

By the 1930s, the notorious period known as the "Great Depression" began to affect the West End area of Davenport, at the time called the Rockingham Township, with severe sickness, hunger, and unsanitary living conditions plagued the area. Eventually, through county and municipal government, the federal Civil Works Administration gave employment to thousands of men. More than 200 jobs were created by the construction of Lock and Dam 15 project within 1932. Hundreds of state employees worked on completing the Kimberly Road Outerbelt Bypass in 1936.

On January 22, 1958, the old Rockingham Township loss its battle with Davenport to try to become seat of the Scott County and ultimately became part of Davenport.

At some point in 1970, Keota Avenue, below to Rockingham, was flooded.

Demographics
The West End's demographics is mostly White with a less percentage of African-Americans, with a fairly amount of those who are of Hispanic or Latino descent. The area is known within its city of having the highest amount of those who are poor to the point of being in Poverty and are uneducated since the Great Depression, the residents in the West End neighborhoods, tends to have a High School Diploma, with many having no High School diploma, and several either having associate degree or some college education, meaning never graduated.

Education
The area consists of two Elementary Schools, Hayes and Monroe and one Intermediate school, Smart, which are a part of the Davenport Community School District. A local Community center on S. Concord Street, which is straight off of Rockingham, called Roosevelt used to be an K-6 elementary school while as then known as "Rockingham" but was changed to what it called now in 1945, as a K–3 school, and it was not until the 1997–98 schoolyear that it was closed officially and turned into a community center.

Landmarks
The historic places include Credit Island, Tri-City Jewish Cemetery, the Putnam Museum, and the House at 2123 W. Second Street. The West End was also home to one of Davenport's oldest church, St. Mary's Catholic Church on 516 Fillmore St, it closed in July 2020. The most well-liked Restaurant in the area is Nally's Kitchen on Rockingham close to Division, a Mexican restaurant that serves authentic Mexican food and Nally's even made its way to be on a Spanish newspaper called Hola America!.

Former places
In 1902, by Rockingham and South Howell Street, a circus was performed, called the Harris Nickel Plate show, now the area is a manufacturer company.

See also
 Rockingham Township, Iowa
 Credit Island

References

Davenport, Iowa